Lieutenant General John F. Mulholland Jr. (born 1955) is a retired senior officer who served in the United States Army and is the former Associate Director for Military Affairs (ADMA) at the Central Intelligence Agency. LTG Mulholland previously served as Deputy Commander of the United States Special Operations Command, after having previously served in the US Army's Special Forces. He commanded special operations task forces in both Operation Enduring Freedom and Operation Iraqi Freedom, earning an appointment as Deputy Commanding General of the Joint Special Operations Command and later as Commanding General, US Army Special Operations Command at Fort Bragg.

Early life
Born in Clovis, New Mexico, Mulholland grew up in Bethesda, Maryland. He graduated from Furman University in 1978 with a Bachelor of Arts degree in history.

Military career
Mulholland graduated from Furman University in 1978 with a bachelor's degree in history and was commissioned there as a second lieutenant in the infantry. His first assignment was in Fort Clayton, Panama, from 1979 to 1980, where he served as a rifle platoon leader in Company C, 4th Battalion (Mechanized), 20th Infantry, 193rd Infantry Brigade. From 1980 to 1982, he was rifle platoon leader and weapons platoon leader in Company A (Airborne), 3rd Battalion, 5th Infantry in Fort Kobbe, Panama. In 1983, he completed the Infantry Officer Advanced Course and then graduated from the Special Forces Qualification Course. He then was assigned to the 5th Special Forces Group (A) at Fort Bragg, where he served as Operational Detachment-A commander and a Company commander from 1984 to 1986. Mulholland returned to Panama from 1987 to 1989, where he was appointed current operations officer and later exercises and ground operations officer in J-3 (Operations), Special Operations Command South, U.S. Southern Command.

He attended the Defense Language Institute and the U.S. Army Command and General Staff College from January 1990 to June 1991. From June 1991 to 1993, Mulholland served with 1st Battalion, 7th Special Forces Group (A) at Fort Bragg as operations officer and later as an executive officer.

Following his tour with the 7th SFG (A), Mulholland received assignment to 1st Special Forces Operational Detachment - Delta where he served as assistant operations officer, deputy operations officer, and unit operations officer until June 1996.

Mulholland commanded 1st Battalion, 1st Special Forces Group (A), U.S. Army Pacific Command in Torii Station, Japan, until June 1998. He then assumed a squadron command within the Intelligence Support Activity until August 2000 when he attended the National War College. He assumed command of 5th Special Forces Group at Fort Campbell, Kentucky in July 2001, and in October that year became commander of Task Force Dagger, Joint Special Operations Task Force North during Operation Enduring Freedom in Afghanistan. He later served as commander of Combined Joint Special Operations Task Force - West and then Coalition-Joint Task Force-Arabian Peninsula during Operation Iraqi Freedom. In August 2003, he was assigned as chief of the Office of Military Cooperation in Kuwait. From August 2005 through July 2006, Mulholland served as commanding general, 1st Special Forces Command (Airborne). From August 2006 until June 2007, he served as deputy commanding general, Joint Special Operations Command. He assumed command of Special Operations Command Central (SOCCENT) at MacDill AFB, FL, on June 22, 2007. He served as the commander of United States Army Special Operations Command from November 7, 2008 until July 24, 2012.

On December 12, 2008, in one of the largest awards ceremonies since the Vietnam era, Mulholland and the 3rd Special Forces Group (Airborne) awarded 19 Silver Star Medals, two Bronze Star Medals for Valor, two Army Commendation Medals for Valor, and four Purple Hearts. In reference to their actions, Mulholland was quoted in saying "If you saw it in a movie, you'd shake your head and say it couldn't happen... But it did".

He also served as a special assistant to the commanding general at U.S. Army Forces Command at Fort Bragg from October 2014 to January 2015 before being selected as Associate Director of the Central Intelligence Agency for Military Affairs.

Personal life
Mulholland's family includes his wife, the former Miriam Mitchell of Clemson, South Carolina, and four children.

Education 
1978 Bachelor of Arts degree, Furman University, Greenville, SC
1991 Master of Military Art and Science degree, United States Army Command and General Staff College
2001 Master of Science degree in national security and strategic studies, National War College

Date of Rank 
Furman University ROTC Cadet – Class of 1978

Awards, Decorations, and Badges 

In recognition of his distinguished service to his country, Mulholland received the Ellis Island Medal of Honor in 2011.

See also

Operation Enduring Freedom
Operation Iraqi Freedom
United States Army Special Operations Command
United States Special Operations Command
War on Terror

References

 Schema-root.org

External links
(Official Biography)

1955 births
Living people
Furman University alumni
United States Army Rangers
Members of the United States Army Special Forces
United States Army Command and General Staff College alumni
National War College alumni
United States Army generals
Recipients of the Legion of Merit
Recipients of the Defense Superior Service Medal
People from Clovis, New Mexico